Tulip is a given name and a surname which may refer to:

Tulip Joshi (born 1980), Bollywood actress
Tulip Mazumdar (born c. 1981), British journalist and broadcaster currently with the BBC
Tulip Siddiq (born 1982), British politician
Bill Tulip (born 1933), English former footballer
Joe Tulip (died 1979), English footballer in the Scottish League, debuting in 1933
Marie Tulip, Australian feminist writer, academic and theologian

Fictional characters
Tulip, a character from the 2016 film Storks
Tulip Olsen, the main character in Book One of the animated anthology series Infinity Train
 MT (Mirror Tulip), a supporting character in Book One and the main character in Book Two of the animated anthology series Infinity Train